Ganaur is a town located, just 23 km from Sonipat City in Sonipat district in the state of Haryana, India.

Demographics 

As of 2011 India census, Ganaur had a population of 35,603 with 18,991 males and 16,612 females. Population of Children with the age of 0-6 is 4459 which is 12.52% of total population of Ganaur (MC). In Ganaur Municipal Committee, Female Sex Ratio is of 875 against state average of 879. Moreover, Child Sex Ratio in Ganaur is around 804 compared to Haryana state average of 834. Literacy rate of Ganaur city is 83.56% higher than state average of 75.55%. In Ganaur, Male literacy is around 90.15% while female literacy rate is 76.12%. Ganaur Municipal Committee has total administration over 6,863 houses. 
It has a great connectivity to the national capital through National Highway and Railway. Every train from ganaur connect with the national capital. The craze for government jobs is paramount in the town. Most of the government employees work in the central government department located in delhi. Around 10 private libraries have been opened in the town.

References

External links
 Sonepat 
 Ganaur Master Plan

Cities and towns in Sonipat district